Éric Gautier (born 2 April 1961) is a French cinematographer. He has received numerous accolades for his work, including a César Award for Those Who Love Me Can Take the Train and an Independent Spirit Award for The Motorcycle Diaries.

Early life
Gautier was born and raised in Paris; he grew up in its eleventh, twelfth, nineteenth and twentieth arrondissements with his construction engineer father, mother, and younger sister. During his youth he excelled in music, and from the age of eleven played the piano and organ. He originally aspired to become a professional musician before becoming disillusioned with the field and deciding to pursue a career in cinema instead, which he felt combined many different creative pursuits. He attended the film school of the Louis Lumière College.

Career
He left the job soon after, however, and chose instead to work as the director of photography on short films. He shot 60 films before returning to feature film work. The first feature-length film he photographed was La Vie des morts, released in 1991 and directed by Arnaud Desplechin. He won a César Award for his cinematography on Those Who Love Me Can Take the Train (1998), and received nominations for his work on Sentimental Destinies (2000), Clean (2004), Gabrielle (2005), Private Fears in Public Places (2006), and A Christmas Tale (2008). He has worked on many other French films, collaborating most often with Resnais and the directors Olivier Assayas, Arnaud Desplechin, and Claude Berri.

Gautier began working in the international film in the early 2000s, beginning with The Motorcycle Diaries, for which he won the Independent Spirit Award for Best Cinematography and the 2004 Cannes Film Festival Technical Grand Prize, and was nominated for the BAFTA Award for Best Cinematography. After seeing The Motorcycle Diaries, American actor/filmmaker Sean Penn approached Gautier to shoot the 2007 film Into the Wild, for which he won a Lumière Award. He subsequently served as director of photography on the American films Taking Woodstock (2009) and Grace of Monaco (2014).

Filmography

Film

Short films

Television

Personal life
Gautier was married until 1995, when his wife Valentine died from cancer at the age of 32. His current partner is Nathalie Boutefeu, an actress with whom he has two daughters, Suzanne and Angela.

References

External links

Living people
1961 births
Cinematographers from Paris
César Award winners
French cinematographers
BAFTA winners (people)